Charalambos Tabasis (born 15 May 1986) is a retired Greek football player who played as goalkeeper. Follow the end of the 2012/13 season, he had to abandon his playing career at the age of 27 due to Stargardt disease.

References

1986 births
Living people
Panionios F.C. players
Egaleo F.C. players
Ilisiakos F.C. players
PAS Giannina F.C. players
Super League Greece players
Footballers from Athens
Greek footballers
Association football goalkeepers